The Coenosiinae are a subfamily of true flies, belonging to the family Muscidae.

References 

Muscidae
Brachycera subfamilies
Taxa named by George Henry Verrall